Jackie Thomas may refer to:

The Jackie Thomas Show, an American sitcom that aired on ABC from 1992 to 1993
Jackie Thomas, Nike executive, former trustee of The Athenian School in California
Jackie Thomas (singer), winner of the first series of The X Factor in New Zealand
Jackie Thomas (album), debut album by Jackie Thomas
Jackie Lynn Thomas, a character in the television series Star vs. the Forces of Evil

See also
Jacqueline Thomas, victim in a high-profile UK murder investigation during the 1960s
Jack Thomas (disambiguation)
John Thomas (disambiguation)